Afroarabiella meyi is a moth in the family Cossidae. It is found in South Africa.

References

Natural History Museum Lepidoptera generic names catalog

Cossinae
Moths described in 2008
Moths of Africa